Extra Ordinary Barry is a comedy film directed by Vivi Stafford and stars Jay Convente, Carrie Chason, Natalie Carter, Amrapali Ambegoakar, featuring additional performances by Ashton Lunceford, Matthew Hatchette and Shell Z.

Release
Extra Ordinary Barry is a comedic feature that premiered at the historical Fine Arts Theater in Beverly Hills and was released in an art house venue in Los Angeles.

Extra Ordinary Barry is comedy film directed by Vivi Stafford and stars Jay Convente, Carrie Chason, Natalie Carter, Amrapali Ambegoakar, featuring additional performances by Ashton Lunceford, Matthew Hatchette and Shell Z.

External links
Extra Ordinary Barry at the Internet Movie Database
Extra Ordinary Barry at the Academy of Motion Picture Arts & Sciences

2008 films
2008 comedy films
American comedy films
2000s American films